Keira Bevan (born 28 April 1997) is a Welsh Rugby Union player who plays scrum half for the Wales women's national rugby union team and Bristol Bears. She made her debut for Wales in 2015.

Club career 
Bevan played rugby on and off as child, eventually taking up the sport fully in January 2014. By the end of the year she had represented Wales in the Rugby Sevens at under-18 level against Sweden, and later at a senior level against Dubai, where Wales won the Women's Invitational event. 

In June 2020 she signed a new deal with the Bristol Bears, having been with the side for seven seasons.

International career 
Bevan made her international debut for Wales playing against England during the 2015 Women's Six Nations Championship. After three appearances as a sub for Amy Day, she made her first start for Wales against Italy in the final round of the championship. 

Bevan has since represented Wales in the 2016, 2017, 2018, 2019 and 2020 Women's Six Nations Championships, as well as the 2017 Women's Rugby World Cup. She made a particular impression during a test match against Ireland ahead of the 2020 Six Nations, when she scored a last-minute try to give Wales the victory.

Bevan had been due to represent Wales at the 2020 Olympic Games in Tokyo, which were subsequently postponed due to the COVID-19 pandemic.

She had been called up for the 2021 Women's Six Nations Championship, but was later ruled out of the tournament due to a leg injury sustained during training, only having recently returned from a long injury-driven spell on the sidelines.

Bevan has earned 41 caps during her career. She was selected in Wales squad for the 2021 Rugby World Cup in New Zealand.

Personal life 
Born in Swansea, Bevan attended Pontarddulais Comprehensive School.

References

External links 

 

1997 births
Living people
Welsh female rugby union players